Polygnathacea is an extinct superfamily of conodonts.

Families
Families are,
 †Cavusgnathidae Clark et al., 1981
 †Palmatolepidae Müller, 1956
 †Polygnathidae Bassler, 1925

References 

 Ontogeny and trophic types of some Tournaisian Polygnathacea (Conodonta). AV Zhuravlev - Courier Forschungsinstitut Senckenberg, 1995
 Variation in the outline and distribution of epithelial cell imprints on the surface of polygnathacean conodont elements. AV Zhuravlev - Lethaia, 2001 - Wiley Online Library
 The architecture and function of Carboniferous polygnathacean conodont apparatuses. RJ Aldridge, MP Smith, RD Norby… - Palaeobiology of …, 1987 - Halsted Press

External links 

 
 Polygnathacea at fossilworks.org (retrieved 1 May 2016)

Vertebrate superfamilies
Ozarkodinida